Authoritarian democracy is a form of democracy directed by a ruling elite of an authoritarian state that seeks to represent the different interests of society. Authoritarian democracy has also been called "organic democracy" by some proponents. In use for cases of fascism and Stalinism it has also been referred to as totalitarian democracy.

Authoritarian democracy was first developed and used by Bonapartism. The Bonapartist conception of authoritarian democracy was based upon Emmanuel Joseph Sieyès's maxim, "confidence from below, authority from above", which he claimed must be an enlightened authority that is responsive to the needs and clamour of the people. 

Authoritarian democracy was promoted by fascists, who presented fascism as a form of authoritarian democracy. It explicitly rejects the conventional concept of democracy as in a majoritarian democracy that assumes equality of citizens. The concept of authoritarian democracy in fascism was developed by Italian fascist political theorist Giovanni Gentile and used by Italian Fascist leader Benito Mussolini. The Nazis supported the concept of authoritarian democracy. Francisco Franco's quasi-fascist Falange in Nationalist Spain promoted the concept, but named it  "organic democracy" that was based upon national plebiscites issued from the Spanish government to the Spanish people.

Variants

Fascist and quasi-fascist

Fascist movements advocate a form of democracy that advocates the rule of the most qualified, rather than rule by a majority of numbers.

Maurice Barrès, who greatly influenced the policies of fascism, claimed that true democracy was authoritarian democracy while rejecting liberal democracy as a fraud. Barrès claimed that authoritarian democracy involved spiritual connection between a leader of a nation and the nation's people, and that true freedom did not arise from individual rights nor parliamentary restraints, but through "heroic leadership" and "national power".

In the fascist and quasi-fascist regimes that governed Italy, Portugal, and Spain from the 1920s to the 1970s, authoritarian democracy was promoted as an alternative to liberal democracy, multi-party based democracy was dismantled and replaced by corporatist representation of state-sanctioned corporate groups that would unite people into interest groups to address the state that would act in the interest of the general will of the nation and thus exercise an orderly form of popular rule. Italian Fascists argued that this authoritarian democracy is capable of representing the different interests of society that advise the state and the state acts in the interest of the nation. In contrast, fascists denounced liberal democracy for not being truly democratic. From the fascist perspective, elections and parliaments are unable to represent the interests of the nation because they lump together individuals with little in common into geographical districts to vote for an array of parties to represent them, resulting in little unanimity in terms of interests. From this perspective, liberal democracy's multi-party elections merely serve as a means to legitimize elite rule without addressing the interests of the general will of the nation.

Hitler denounced parliamentary and pluralistic electoral democracy but he repeatedly invoked democracy to describe Nazism, and called for a "German democracy", once saying "National Socialism is the true realization of democracy" and another time saying "We wild Germans are better democrats than other nations". Nazi Germany's propaganda minister Joseph Goebbels described Nazism as an "authoritarian democracy" on 31 May 1933 in a speech before the press. Nazi political theorist Walter Gerhart affirmed the concept of authoritarian democracy as being able to link authority with the people's will that would be the anti-thesis of liberal democracy that he claimed lacked authority and divided people in an atomistic society. Jacob Talmon identifies as Nazism as promoting a "totalitarian democracy", while W. Martini identifies it as a "hyper-democracy". What W. Martini claims is that the Nazi regime appealed directly to the masses without institutional and social checks and balances of liberal democracy.

See also 
 Dictablanda
 Illiberal democracy
 Ruscism
 Totalitarian democracy

References

Authoritarianism
Fascism
Types of democracy